The Rwandese National Union (UNAR) was a conservative, pro-monarchy political party in Rwanda.

History
Union Nationale Rwandaise (Rwandese National Union), or UNAR, was a conservative Rwandan political party.  Founded on 3 September 1959, by François Rukeba, and strongly supported by King Kigeri V. At the time, Rwanda was still under Belgian administration, and UNAR was the leading monarchist party. It called for immediate independence under a hereditary Tutsi constitutional monarchy. Michel Rwagasana became its secretary general.

The party boycotted the 1960 local elections, but participated in the 1961 parliamentary elections, receiving 17% of the vote, winning 7 of the 44 seats in the Legislative Assembly. It joined a coalition government with the victorious Parmehutu, and was given the cabinet posts responsible for cattle and public health.

On 21 December 1963 Rwandan Tutsi exiles from Burundi attacked a military camp in Gako, Bugesera. They then advanced on Kigali before being stopped and defeated by the Rwandan National Guard. The Rwandan regime subsequently moved to purge moderate Hutu politicians and UNAR members. Pierre Claver Karyabwite, vice president of the UNAR youth wing, was tipped off by a local official that UNAR's leadership was to be executed. He drove to Nyamirambo, where UNAR was headquartered and where Rwagasana and party president Joseph Rutsindintwarane lived to warn them of the danger. According to Karyabwite, the two refused to flee. On 23 December the UNAR leaders and moderates were detained and taken to Ruhengeri. Over the course of the night they were tortured and early the following morning they were brought to Nyamagumba hill and executed under the supervision of a Belgian officer, Major Turpin. After the purge, UNAR effectively ceased to exist. Elements of the armed wing continued to carry out attacks until 1967.

In 1965 the country became a one-party state under Parmehutu.

References

Ruanda-Urundi
Conservative parties in Africa
Monarchist parties
Defunct political parties in Rwanda
Political parties established in 1959
Political parties disestablished in 1963
1959 establishments in Rwanda
1963 disestablishments in Rwanda